Baby Boy da Prince is a rapper from New Orleans.

His only album, Across the Water, was released on March 20, 2007.

Discography

Albums
2007: Across the Water

Singles

References

 http://www.rapnews.net/0-202-261846-00.html?tag=artistnav Retrieved on December 3, 2006
 https://web.archive.org/web/20160303172345/http://www.sixshot.com/articles/6550/
 

African-American male rappers
American male rappers
Living people
Rappers from New Orleans
Southern hip hop musicians
21st-century American rappers
21st-century American male musicians
21st-century African-American musicians
20th-century African-American people
1986 births